George Young, Lord Young,  (2 July 1819 – 21 May 1907) was a Scottish Liberal MP in the British Parliament and a judge, with the judicial title of Lord Young.

Life
He was born in Dumfries and educated locally before being sent to the University of Edinburgh to study law. He became a member of the Faculty of Advocates in 1840 and was also called to the English bar. He held the judicial offices of Sheriff of Inverness in 1853–1860 and Haddington and Berwick in 1860–1862.

He was appointed Solicitor General for Scotland in 1862–1866 and 1868–1869. He was appointed Lord Advocate in 1869, the most senior legal position in Scotland, and technically a governmental post. This role is primarily one of law-making.

He represented Wigtown Burghs in 1865–1874, until he lost an election. After an election petition, that election was declared void and the seat awarded to Young on 28 May 1874. However, in June 1874, he was appointed a Judge of the Court of Session and left Parliament.

On 3 March 1874 he was created a Senator of the College of Justice with the title Lord Young. He served until 1905.

He lived his final years at 28 Moray Place on the prestigious Moray Estate in western Edinburgh.

He is buried with his wife Janet Bell (d. 1901), daughter of George Graham Bell, near the south-west corner of St John's churchyard in Edinburgh. Given his wealth and power it is a very humble grave.

Legislation

The most important legislation framed and created by Lord Young was the Education (Scotland) Act 1872 under which every town and village in Scotland were obliged to give free education to both boys and girls from the age of five to the age of eleven. This created a wave of school building across Scotland. Whilst children were still permitted to attend private schools they were not permitted to attend no school, and also imbedded in this legislation is the creation of the concept of truancy.

Family
He married Janet Graham Bell on 18 July 1847.

They had 14 children:
Janet 1848-?
Alexander 1849-71 who died aged 22 leaving a succession problem for his lordship
George Graham Bell 1850–1905. George was dispatched to Hong Kong under a cloud where he married Frances Emily Huffam on 28 Feb 1880. The couple later migrated to Australia to a sheep property outside Goulburn NSW. This line of the family continues to live in New South Wales, Australia.
William 1852-1923
Lillias (Lily) 1854-? , married Charles Kincaid Mackenzie (later styled Lord Mackenzie).
Marion 1856-?
Christian 1858-?
Elizabeth 1861-1929
Annabel Jane 1864-1923
Arthur 1866
Edward 1868-1923
Charles 1870-?
Edith 1871-?
Henry 1875-?

Their daughter Lillias (Lily) Young, married Charles Kincaid Mackenzie (later styled Lord Mackenzie).

Janet Graham Bell died in Edinburg on 15 Oct 1901 and was followed 6 years later by Lord George Young in 1907

[Updated by: Geoffrey Bruce Young - Great Great Grandson and Great Grandson of George Graham Bell Young]

References

Sources

 Who's Who of British Members of Parliament: Volume I 1832-1885, edited by M. Stenton (The Harvester Press 1976)

External links 
 

1819 births
1907 deaths
Scottish Liberal Party MPs
Members of the Parliament of the United Kingdom for Scottish constituencies
UK MPs 1865–1868
UK MPs 1868–1874
UK MPs 1874–1880
Members of the Faculty of Advocates
Young
Solicitors General for Scotland
Lord Advocates
Members of the Privy Council of the United Kingdom
Scottish sheriffs